Aggregatibacter is a genus in the phylum Pseudomonadota (Bacteria), which contains three species, namely:
 A. actinomycetemcomitans (Klinger 1912) Nørskov-Lauritsen and Kilian 2006, (type species of the genus); (from Greek noun  (ἀκτίς, ἀκτῖνος), a beam; Greek mukēs -ētos, mushroom or other fungus; New Latin actinomyces -etis, an actinomycete; Latin comitans, accompanying; New Latin actinomycetemcomitans, accompanying an actinomycete)
 A. aphrophilus (Khairat 1940) Nørskov-Lauritsen and Kilian 2006, (from Ancient Greek , foam; New Latin  from Greek  (φίλος) meaning friend, loving; New Latin aphrophilus, foam-loving)
 A. segnis (Kilian 1977) Nørskov-Lauritsen and Kilian 2006, (from Latin segnis, slow, sluggish, inactive)

See also
 Bacterial taxonomy
 Microbiology

References 

Bacteria genera
Pasteurellales